Timber Stampede is a 1939 American Western film directed by David Howard from a screenplay by Morton Grant, based on a story by Bernard McConville and Paul Franklin. The film stars George O'Brien, Chill Wills, and Marjorie Reynolds. RKO Radio Pictures produced and distributed the film, which was released on June 30, 1939.

Plot

Cast
 George O'Brien as Scott Baylor
 Chill Wills as Whopper Hatch
 Marjorie Reynolds as Anne Carr
 Morgan Wallace as Dunlap
 Robert Fiske as Matt Chaflin
 Guy Usher as Jay Jones
 Earl Dwire as Henry Clay Baylor
 Frank Hagney as Champ - Henchman
 Bob Burns as Sheriff Lyman
 Monte Montague as Jake
 Bud Osborne as Brady

References

External links
 
 
 
 

American Western (genre) films
1939 Western (genre) films
1939 films
RKO Pictures films
American black-and-white films
Films produced by Bert Gilroy
Films directed by David Howard
1930s American films